Morlocks are a fictional species in the H. G. Wells novel The Time Machine.

Morlock may also refer to:

Fictional characters

 Morlocks, an alien species in the Known Space fictional universe of Larry Niven, named after H. G. Wells' Morlocks
 Morlocks (comics), a group of Marvel Comics comic book characters
 The villains in Power Rangers: Mystic Force, sometimes referred to as "Morlocks"
 The human agents of the forces of Hell on Earth in the short-lived science fiction television series G vs. E
 Morlock Ambrosius, a recurring character in James Enge's Morlock the Maker series

Music
The Morlocks (American band), an American garage band
Morlocks (Swedish band), a Swedish industrial rock band

People
 Jocelyn Morlock (born 1969), Canadian composer
 Max Morlock (1925–1994), German footballer
 Jeremy Morlock, US Army soldier, member of the FOB Ramrod "Kill Team" that murdered three Afghan civilians in early 2010

See also
 Morlachs, an old ethnic designation in Dalmatia
 Merlock (disambiguation)
 Morelock, a surname